Simon Petrén (born 14 March 1986) is a Swedish music producer, songwriter, mix engineer and mastering engineer. He holds a Diploma in Piano Music Performance at the Royal Schools of Music in London and a Bachelor degree in Film Scoring and Music Production at the Royal College of Music in Stockholm.

Simon Petrén is the producer as well as mix/mastering engineer for the YouTube phenomena Dirty Loops. Their debut album was released by David Foster and Verve Records/Universal Music, USA/Japan (May 19, 2014). As of 2019 they are managed by Quincy Jones.

Simon Petrén is credited with Arranging, Production, Mixing, Mastering as well as the video production of the 2016 version of “Over the Horizon”, the Samsung Galaxy brand sound, coming pre-loaded as mp3 & default ringtone on all of the Galaxy devices.

Simon Petrén lives in Seoul, South Korea, consulting for different entertainment companies as songwriter/producer/mix&mastering engineer.

Notable writing and production credits

References

External links

Swedish record producers
Swedish songwriters
Living people
1986 births